Here Come the Seventies was a CBC Radio comedy show that was broadcast as part of the Variety Tonight program. Despite the name - a deliberate take-off of Here Come the Seventies, a 1970s CTV television show - this show was broadcast for one season in the early 1980s. While it often focused on topical humour, its brand of often surreal and character-based confrontational humour presaged that of The Frantics, arguably its immediate comedic successors on CBC radio.

It starred Don Dickenson, Frank Daley, Kathy Gallant and Hugh Graham.

CBC Radio One programs
Canadian radio sketch shows
Surreal comedy radio series